Fuzzy Sets and Systems is a peer-reviewed international scientific journal published by Elsevier on behalf of the International Fuzzy Systems Association (IFSA) and was founded in 1978. The editors-in-chief (as of 2010) are Bernard De Baets of the Department of Data Analysis and Mathematical Modelling (at Ghent University in Belgium), Didier Dubois (of IRIT, Université Paul Sabatier in Toulouse, France) and Eyke Hüllermeier (of the Department of Mathematics, Statistics and Computer Science, Ludwig-Maximilians Universität München, Germany).  The journal publishes 24 issues a year. Fuzzy Sets and Systems is abstracted and indexed by Scopus and the Science Citation Index. According to the Journal Citation Reports released in 2010, its 2-year impact factor calculated for 2020 is 3.343 and its 5-year impact factor for 2020 is 3.213.

References

See also 
 Fuzzy control system
 Fuzzy Control Language
 Fuzzy logic
 Fuzzy set

Fuzzy logic
Computer science journals
Publications established in 1978
Elsevier academic journals
Academic journals associated with learned and professional societies